The following are lists of disasters.

Natural disasters 
A natural disaster is a major adverse event resulting from natural processes of the earth. 
These lists are of disasters caused by forces of nature.
 List of avalanches
 List of blizzards
 List of derecho events
 List of droughts
 Lists of earthquakes
 List of environmental disasters
 List of fires
 List of wildfires
 List of California wildfires
 List of floods
 History of flooding in Canada
 List of deadliest floods
 List of flash floods
 List of floods in the Netherlands
 List of floods in Pakistan
 List of floods in Sheffield
 List of heat waves
 List of ice storms
 List of landslides
 List of natural disasters by death toll
 List of solar storms
 Lists of tornadoes and tornado outbreaks
 List of tropical cyclones
 List of historical tsunamis
 List of volcanic eruptions
 List of large volcanic eruptions of the 19th century
 List of large volcanic eruptions of the 20th century
 List of large volcanic eruptions in the 21st century
 List of volcanic eruptions by death toll

Accidents 
These are lists of disasters caused by accidental human action.
 List of accidents and disasters by death toll

Transport 
 List of aviation accidents and incidents
 List of accidents and incidents involving commercial aircraft
 Lists of accidents and incidents involving military aircraft
 List of airship accidents
 List of ballooning accidents
 List of accidents and incidents involving helicopters
 List of elevator accidents
 List of maritime disasters
 List of shipwrecks
 List of rail accidents
 List of tram accidents
 List of road accidents
 List of spaceflight-related accidents and incidents

Industrial 
 List of industrial disasters
 List of natural gas and oil production accidents in the United States
 List of structural failures and collapses
 List of bridge failures
 List of dam failures
 List of levee failures
 List of mast and tower collapses
 List of modern infrastructure failures
 List of explosions
 List of mining disasters
 List of coal mining accidents in China
 List of gold mining disasters
 List of mining disasters in Lancashire
 List of mining disasters in Poland
 Nuclear and radiation accidents
 Japanese nuclear incidents
 List of civilian radiation accidents
 List of Chernobyl-related articles
 List of nuclear and radiation accidents by death toll
 Lists of nuclear disasters and radioactive incidents
 List of sunken nuclear submarines
 List of oil spills

Health 
 List of famines
 List of food contamination incidents
 List of epidemics
 List of mass evacuations
 List of medicine contamination incidents
 List of methanol poisoning incidents

Manmade 
These are lists of disasters caused by deliberate human action or public endangerment or culpable negligence.
 List of amusement park accidents
 List of explosions
 List of fires
 List of building or structure fires
 List of circus fires
 List of hotel fires in the United States
 List of nightclub fires
 List of town and city fires
 List of transportation fires
 List of fireworks accidents and incidents
 List of man-made mass poisoning incidents
 List of orphan radioactive source incidents
 List of massacres
 List of crushes (almost all caused by failures of management)
 List of military disasters
 List of riots
 List of terrorist incidents
 List of wars
 List of battles and other violent events
 List of wars and anthropogenic disasters

Environmental hazard 
 List of power outages
 Pollution

By location 
 List of disasters in Antarctica
 List of disasters in Australia
 List of disasters in Canada
 List of disasters in Canada by death toll
 List of disasters in Croatia
 List of disasters in Great Britain and Ireland
 List of disasters in Haiti
 Lists of disasters in Indonesia
 List of disasters in Indonesia
 List of earthquakes in Indonesia
 List of natural disasters in Indonesia
 List of disasters in New Zealand
 List of natural disasters in New Zealand
 List of disasters in Pakistan
 List of disasters in the Philippines
 List of disasters in Poland
 List of disasters in South Korea
 List of disasters in Thailand
 List of disasters in the United States

Other 
 List of disasters by cost

See also